Michael Lindqvist (born 12 December 1994) is a Swedish professional ice hockey forward for Färjestad BK of the Swedish Hockey League (SHL).

Playing career
Lindqvist made his Elitserien debut playing with AIK during the 2012–13 Elitserien season.

Having played seven seasons within the AIK organization and with the club continuing in the Allsvenskan, Lindqvist left the club and signed a contract to return to the SHL with Färjestad BK on 31 March 2017. In the following 2017–18 season, Lindqvist led the club in points per game and established new career highs with 20 goals and 34 points in just 33 games.

On 2 May 2018, as an undrafted free agent, Lindqvist agreed to terms on a one-year contract with the New York Rangers of the National Hockey League (NHL). On 13 November, the Rangers placed Lindqvist on waivers with the intention of buying out his contract. On 14 November, he returned to Sweden and signed a contract until the end of the 2018–19 season with his former team, Färjestad BK of the SHL.

Career statistics

Awards and honours

References

External links
 

1994 births
Living people
AIK IF players
Färjestad BK players
Hartford Wolf Pack players
Swedish ice hockey right wingers